Khin Hnin Yu (7 September 1925 – 21 January 2003) was a two-time Myanmar National Literature Award winner. She is considered one of the most influential Burmese women writers. Her stories are known for their realistic portrayal of life in post-World War II Burma (now Myanmar). She is an early member of Distinguished women writers, who represent an ever-present force in Burmese literary history, along with Kyi Aye and San San Nweh.  Almost all her over 50 published novels involve young heroines who had to struggle for their survival.

Khin Hnin Yu was a cousin of, and the personal secretary for, the former Burmese Prime Minister U Nu for more than 20 years. Khin Hnin Yu attended Myoma High School in Yangon. She died in 2003 at the age of 78.

Biography
Khin Hnin Yu was born Khin Su, the fifth of seven children, to Daw Thein Tin and school teacher U Ba in Wakema in the Irrawaddy delta. A cousin of U Nu, she served as the former Prime Minister's personal secretary for more than 20 years. She married Kyaw Thaung, a colonel in the Burmese army, in 1950.

Her first short story "Ayaing" ("The Wild") was published in Sar Padaytha magazine in 1947. In 1950, her first novel, Nwe Naung Ywet Kyan (Remnant Leaf of Late Summer), was published in Shumawa magazine. She wrote over 50 novels and most are known for her political views of the parliamentary and military socialist eras (1948-1980s). For example, her 1955 short story "Mhyawlint Lo Phyint Ma Sohn Naing De" ("Still Hoping") covers the social stigma still faced by a daughter of former pagoda slaves. A semi-biographical novel Kyunma Chit Thu (My Lover) was banned by Gen. Ne Win's government, and the themes of her later books shifted to focus on religion.

Khin Hnin Yu died in Yangon on 21 January 2003 at the Yangon General Hospital.

Works
Khin Hnin Yu wrote over 50 novels and about six volumes of short-stories collections. Her famous works include:

Most of her novels are adapted into the famous films. Her novella Pan Pan Lhwet Par (Still Wearing Flower) was made into film of the same name in 1963, starring Kawleikgyin Ne Win, Myat Lay and Kyi Kyi Htay. It was very successful, running over 25 weeks and become highest-grossing film in history of Myanmar Cinema.

Awards
Khin Hnin Yu won top Myanmar National Literature Award twice.
1953: Popular Reader Choice (Myawaddy Magazine), Tharahpu
1961: Myanmar National Literature Award for Collected Short Stories, Kyemon Yeik-Thwin Wuttu-to Myar
1995: Myanmar National Literature Award for Fiction,Mya Kyar Phyu

References

1925 births
2003 deaths
Burmese writers
People from Ayeyarwady Region
20th-century Burmese writers
20th-century Burmese women writers